Triple mix is a mixture of three equal parts of topsoil, peat, and compost.  It is commercially sold as a means to amend a variety of poor soil conditions.  Generally used for establishing or maintaining lawns and gardens.

References

Gardening